The 1999 German Athletics Championships were held at the Steigerwaldstadion in Erfurt on 2–4 July 1999.

Results

Men

Women 

 : Wind assisted

References 
 Results source: 

1999
German Athletics Championships
German Athletics Championships